Dr. Yehuda Ben-Meir (born 27 July 1939) is a former Israeli academic and politician who served as a member of the Knesset for the National Religious Party and Gesher – Zionist Religious Centre between 1971 and 1984.

Biography
Born Yehuda Rosenberg in New York City in 1939, the son of Shlomo-Yisrael Rosenberg, Ben-Meir studied at the Yishuv HaHadash yeshiva in Tel Aviv, Yeshiva University, and Columbia University, earning a doctorate in psychology. He made aliyah to Israel in 1962, and worked as a lecturer in psychology at Bar-Ilan University until 1968.

One of the leaders of the Gesher youth faction of the National Religious Party (NRP), he was director of the party's youth bureau, a member of its actions committee and directorate (which he also chaired), as well as being a member of the world secretariat of Mizrachi and Hapoel HaMizrachi.

He was on the NRP list for the 1969 elections, but failed to win a seat. However, he entered the Knesset on 4 April 1971 as a replacement for his deceased father. He was re-elected in 1973, 1977, and 1981. In August 1981, he was appointed Deputy Minister of Foreign Affairs. In May 1984, he and Zevulun Hammer left the NRP to establish Gesher – Zionist Religious Centre, though both returned to the NRP two weeks later. He lost his seat in the July 1984 elections.

After leaving the Knesset, Ben-Meir became a senior lecturer, and also studied law, later becoming a practising lawyer. In 1988, he left the NRP again, and was amongst the founders of Meimad, a left-wing religious Zionist party.

References

External links
 

1939 births
20th-century American Jews
Yeshiva University alumni
Columbia University alumni
American emigrants to Israel
Israeli academics
Academic staff of Bar-Ilan University
Israeli psychologists
Israeli lawyers
Living people
National Religious Party politicians
Gesher – Zionist Religious Centre politicians
Members of the 7th Knesset (1969–1974)
Members of the 8th Knesset (1974–1977)
Members of the 9th Knesset (1977–1981)
Members of the 10th Knesset (1981–1984)
Deputy ministers of Israel
21st-century American Jews